Triston Reilly (born 14 January 1999) is a professional rugby league player for the Wests Tigers in the NRL. His regular playing positions are Centre and Wing. He played for Randwick Rugby at club level.

Rugby career 
Reilly exploded on to the rugby scene, making his debut just one year out of the prestigious rugby nursery of St Joseph's College, Hunters Hill. The 19 year old made a great impression on Australian Sevens coach Tim Walsh in his second world series cap in London, scoring 3 tries in just 2 games, before getting injured for the remaining games. In 2017, Reilly played for the Australian youth rugby sevens team who finished third in the World youth all schools tournament which was played New Zealand, where he scored 5 tries.

Reilly made his debut for the Australian sevens team in April 2018.

References 

1999 births
Living people
Australian rugby league players
Australian rugby union players
Australian rugby sevens players
Male rugby sevens players
Rugby league players from New South Wales
Rugby league wingers
Rugby union players from New South Wales
Rugby union wings
Sydney (NRC team) players
New South Wales Waratahs players